Patna–Guwahati High Speed Rail Corridor is one of the six new proposed high-speed rail lines that will run from Bihar's capital Patna to Assam's largest city, Guwahati, via the Siliguri Corridor.

This line is set to boost the connectivity in Northeastern India by linking with the Delhi–Kolkata line.

Possible stations
The route is according to the planned alignment as shown in National Rail Plan's (NRP) High-speed rail line map.
As far as it is planned, the possible routes may be via Katihar & New Jalpaiguri with a  spur line to connect Howrah from Katihar. From Patna to Guwahati, Barauni, Khagaria, Naugachhia, Kishanganj, New Coochbehar, New Bongaigaon & Rangiya may be the stations enroute. For Howrah connection line, Nabadwip Dham, Bolpur Rampurhat & Malda Town  may be the stations enroute.

See also
 High-speed rail in India
 Varanasi–Howrah high-speed rail corridor
 Delhi–Varanasi high-speed rail corridor

References

External links
 
 

2020 in rail transport
High-speed railway lines in India
India–Japan relations
Proposed railway lines in India
Rail transport in Assam
Rail transport in Bihar
Rail transport in West Bengal
Standard gauge railways in India
Transport in Guwahati
Transport in Patna